Odd Børre Sørensen (9 August 1939 – 28 January 2023) was a Norwegian pop singer. Internationally, he is best known for the song "Stress" that he performed in the Eurovision Song Contest of 1968. He sang in the Kjell Karlsen's Orchestra (1962–70) and was releasing singles during that period. He retired from full-time professional singing in 1970 and became an insurance company agent (although he did perform in the Norwegian national finals in 1971 and 1977 and was one of the judges in the 1978 final). After retiring in the early 2000s, Odd Børre teamed up again with Kjell Karlsen and performed with him.

Børre died on 28 January 2023, at the age of 83.

Melodi Grand Prix entries

 * Odd Børre & The Cannons
 ** The winner, which was written by Kari Nergaard, was accused of being a copy of Cliff Richard's "Summer Holiday"" and it was withdrawn prior to NRK investigating the accusations. The second-place song "Stress" was substituted.
 *** Along with Jan-Erik Berntsen

References

External links
 
 

1939 births
2023 deaths
Eurovision Song Contest entrants of 1968
Melodi Grand Prix contestants
Melodi Grand Prix winners
Eurovision Song Contest entrants for Norway
Norwegian male singers
Norwegian pop singers
English-language singers from Norway
Musicians from Harstad